Pieriballia is a genus of butterflies in the family Pieridae erected by Alexander Barrett Klots in 1933. Its only species, Pieriballia viardi, the painted white or viardi white, was first described by Jean Baptiste Boisduval in 1836. It is found from Mexico to Bolivia and Paraguay. Strays can be found in southern Texas in the United States. The habitat consists of rainforests and transitional cloud forests.

The larvae feed on Capparis pseudocacao.

Subspecies
The following subspecies are recognised:
P. v. viardi (Mexico, Honduras)
P. v. locusta (C. Felder & R. Felder, 1861) (Colombia)
P. v. mandela (C. Felder & R. Felder, 1861) (Venezuela)
P. v. noctipennis (Butler & H. Druce, 1872) (Costa Rica, Panama)
P. v. apicalis (Butler, 1898) (Ecuador)
P. v. tithoreides (Butler, 1898) (Ecuador)
P. v. rubecula (Fruhstorfer, 1907) (Peru, Bolivia)
P. v. molione (Fruhstorfer, 1908) (Paraguay, Argentina)
P. v. decorata (Joicey & Talbot, 1928) (Peru)
P. v. interposita (Joicey & Talbot, 1928) (Peru)

References

Pierini
Monotypic butterfly genera
Pieridae of South America
Taxa named by Alexander Barrett Klots
Pieridae genera